Hallstahammar Municipality (Hallstahammars kommun) is a municipality in Västmanland County in central Sweden. Its seat is located in the town of Hallstahammar.

In 1971 "old" Hallstahammar (with the status of a köping since 1943) was amalgamated with parts of the dissolved Kolbäck rural municipality to form the present municipality of unitary type.

The municipal slogan is "Bo hos oss" ("Live with us"), which reflects the ambition of the present municipal leadership to boost population figures.

Geography 
The municipality is subdivided into two parishes: Hallstahammar-Berg and Kolbäck-Säby. They are distinctive from each other: Hallstahammar-Berg in the north is situated along forest lands; Kolbäck-Säby in the south is a centre of communications by roads and railways as well as the intersecting river. Strömsholm, in the southern part of Kolbäck, borders to Lake Mälaren and has open fields around its Royal Castle.

Riksdag elections

Communications 
With train it takes 10 minutes to central Västerås (a larger city), and about an hour to the Central Station of Stockholm. It is also possible to travel straight south, passing the bridge over Lake Mälaren to the larger city Eskilstuna. Good car transport is provided by European route E18 that passes between Kolbäck and Hallstahammar.

Notability 
One of Sweden's foremost riding gymnasiums is located in Strömsholm, as part of the Kantzowska Gymnasium. The Church of Kolbäck goes back to the 13th century and has interior decorations paid for by Queen Hedvig Eleonora in the 17th century. The Church of Säby was beautifully restored in the 1630s.

References

External links

Hallstahammar Municipality - Official site

Municipalities of Västmanland County